Drybar is a California based chain of salons that provides a hair styling service known as blowouts. The company was founded in 2008 by Alli Webb.

History 

In 2008, Alli Webb began a side business called Straight At Home, which provided an in-home hair experience. As demand quickly outgrew the one-woman operation, Webb noticed a "huge hole" in her local market for a business that provided solely hair blowouts, a concept that had already gained traction in larger cities such as New York City with brands like "Blo". Along with her brother, Michael Landau and her husband, Cameron Webb, Alli co-founded what would become Drybar by opening a salon in Brentwood, California in 2010. The following year, along with the help of friends, she raised $2.5 million to expand the business. Once the business expanded, Drybar looked to add investors, as well as add to its board of trustees. They added Castanea Partners, a Boston-based private equity firm, to their list of investors in January 2012. Paul Pressler, the former CEO of GAP and President of Disney, became an investor and board member. Janet Gurwitch, the founder & former CEO of Laura Mercier Cosmetics, also became an investor and board member at Drybar.

In 2019, the American consumer goods corporation Helen of Troy acquired the Drybar trademark. In 2021, WellBiz Brands, Inc. acquired the Drybar shops' franchise rights.

Style of business 
Everything at Drybar is referenced using the “bar vernacular”. The cashiers are called “bartenders” and hairstyles are named after cocktails, such as the Cosmo, Mai Tai, or Manhattan. The idea behind this came from Webb. Webb’s vision is present in the designs of architect Josh Heitler. Heitler, principal of a boutique architectural firm and now a partner in the company, came up with the design elements and look of Drybar. Instead of the typical salon set up, clients at Drybar “sit facing a U-shaped or single-stretch bar, with their backs to the mirrors,” which brings to mind sitting at a bar rather than being at a salon. The bars have flat-screen televisions which generally screen chick-flick movies. Aesthetically, all Drybars look roughly the same.

Locations 

Drybar revenue grew from $1.5 million in 2010 to revenue of  $19 million in 2012 to $39 million in 2013. As of January 2016, Drybar had 66 locations in 11 states, Washington DC and Vancouver, British Columbia. As of November 2017, the number of locations had expanded to almost 90. As of October 2018, the company had over 100 locations and 3000 employees.

Products 

Looking to increase revenue, Webb (along with the help of Board member and investor Janet Gurwitch) developed a line of products specifically for Drybar.

In 2013, after testing the line in about 70 Sephora locations, Drybar then went ahead with 300+ Sephora shops and QVC to launch their line of products.

The motto of Drybar is "No cuts. No color. Just wash & blowouts." which is a reference to their primary service offering.

References

External links
 

Hairdressing salon chains
American companies established in 2008
Retail companies established in 2008
2008 establishments in California